Igor Vladimirovich Usminskiy (born 23 April 1977) is a former Russian professional footballer.

Club career
He made his professional debut in the Russian Premier League in 1996 for FC Zhemchuzhina Sochi.

Honours
 Russian Cup winner: 2004 (played in the early stages of the 2003–04 tournament for FC Terek Grozny).

References

External links
 

1977 births
Living people
Russian footballers
Jewish footballers
FC Zhemchuzhina Sochi players
FC Chernomorets Novorossiysk players
FC Akhmat Grozny players
FC SKA Rostov-on-Don players
FC Amkar Perm players
Russian Premier League players
Maccabiah Games competitors for Russia
Maccabiah Games footballers
Sportspeople from Grozny
Association football goalkeepers
FC Volgar Astrakhan players
FC Krasnodar players
FC Slavyansk Slavyansk-na-Kubani players